Elvis Raúl Trujillo (born October 7, 1983, in Panama City, Panama) is a jockey in American Thoroughbred horse racing best known for riding Maryfield to victory in the 2007 Breeders' Cup Filly & Mare Sprint. He is known for being the King of Monmouth Park. He is also known for being the regular rider of Precious Passion. Born in Panama City, where he began his career as a jockey, he came to the United States in 2002. Since 2017, he has surpassed more than $70,000,000 in purse earnings and has won more than 2,000 races.

A winner of more than 50 Graded Stakes, such as the 2007 Breeders' Cup Filly & Mare Sprint. Trujillo has also won major Graded Stakes such as The 2008 & 2009 United Nation Stakes, Summit of Speed Smile Sprint, La Brea Stakes, Princess Rooney Handicap, Clement L. Hirsch Memorial Turf Championship Stakes, and many more major horse races.

Trujillo rode in his native Panama and in Mexico City before emigrating to the United States in 2001 where in the fall he got his first win at Hollywood Park Racetrack.

In 2009, Trujillo was the leading rider at Monmouth Park with 129 wins in 601 starts, beating Eddie Castro, Carlos H. Marquez, Jr., and Joe Bravo in the overall standing.

Background 
Trujillo was born in Panama City, Panama, where he learned to ride at the Laffit Pincay Jockey School. In 2001 he got his first win in his native Panama at Hipodromo Presidente Remon. That same year he moved to Mexico City where he met his future wife(Raquel Trujillo) and would win more than 80 races. In 2001, he would migrate to the United States where in the fall he would get his first win at Hollywood Park Racetrack. In 2002, his son would be born in Mexico City, Mexico where he would have to bring his family to the United States of America and start a new chapter of his life.

Personal life 
Trujillo is a representative of the Jockeys' Guild for the state of Florida and New Jersey and he is also a member of the Permanently Disabled Jockeys Fund.

Trujillo is married to Raquel Trujillo. Residing in Miramar, Florida, they have three children together, sons Elvis Jr, Emanuel, and Jorge Trujillo.

Trujillo rode his last race as a professional jockey in 2018. As of 2020, he is now a trainer based in Maryland.

Major races

Statistics by year

Year-end charts

References
 Elvis Trujillo at the NTRA

1983 births
 Living people
 Panamanian jockeys
 American jockeys
 Sportspeople from Panama City
 Panamanian emigrants to the United States